Jacob ben David Pardo was an 18th-century rabbi, author and poet.

He served as rabbi at Ragusa (Dubrovnik) and Spalato (Split). He was the author of: "Marpe Lashon" (Venice, 1780), prayers and religious poems for children, printed conjointly with his "Tehillah be-Eretz," poems on the earthquake in Ragusa; "Kehillat Ya'akob" (ib. 1784), commentary on the Earlier Prophets; "Appe Zutre" (ib. 1797), novellæ to the treatise "Hilkot Ishshut," i.e., precepts for women; "Tokfo shel Nes" (ib. 1798), introduction to the "Ma'aseh Nissim" of Aaron Cohen Ragusano; "Minchat Aharon" (ib. 1809), precepts for the religious ritual upon awakening, for the three daily prayers, and moral precepts; "Mishkenot Ya'akob" (Leghorn, 1824), commentary on Isaiah, published by his son David Samuel.

References 

18th-century Croatian poets
18th-century Croatian rabbis
Jewish poets
Croatian Sephardi Jews
Clergy from Split, Croatia
Place of birth missing
Place of death missing
Year of birth missing
Year of death missing
Writers from Split, Croatia